The name Love vine is variously applied to:
 Cassytha species alleged to have aphrodisiac properties
 Clematis virginiana, a North American ornamental vine. 
 Cuscuta species confused with Cassytha
 Ipomoea lobata, or Mina Lobata a Brazilian vine related to Morning glory